is a Japanese voice actor from Osaka prefecture. He is affiliated with I'm Enterprise. He won the Best New Actor Award and Singing Award at the 13th Seiyu Awards.

Filmography

Television animation

Anime films

Original video animation (OVA)

Original net animation (ONA)

Video games

Dubbing

Radio programs 

 Lost Village ‟Public relations division in Nanaki village hall”(迷家‐マヨイガ‐「納鳴村 村役場広報課」, Mayoiga Nanaki Mura Mura Yakuba Kouhouka)(2016)
 Kentarō Tone with unpleasant company (利根健太郎とゆかいな仲間たち, Tone Keontarō to Yukai na Nakamatachi)(2017)
 Monthly: New “Handsome communication”(月刊 新・男前通信,  Gekkan Otokomae Tsūshin)(2017)
 Kōhei Amasaki, Takeo Ōtsuka ‟Are We Friends Yet?”(天﨑滉平、大塚剛央の僕たちもうフレンドですよね？,  Amasaki Kōhei, Ōtsuka Takeo no Bokutachi Mou Friend Desuyone?)(2017-)
 RADIO M4!!!!(2017-)
 THE IDOLM@STER SideM Radio “315 Pro Night!”(アイドルマスター SideM ラジオ 315プロNight!, Idolmaster SideM Radio Saikō Puro Night)(2018)
 Matsuoka Hamburg steak(松岡ハンバーグ, Matsuoka Hamburg)(2018-)
 MAN TWO MONTH RADIO “Kōhei Amasaki's OTAKU report” (MAN TWO MONTH RADIO 天﨑滉平のオタク探訪, MAN TWO MONTH RADIO Amasaki Kōhei no Otaku Tanbō)(2018)
 Tomohito Takatsuka, Kōhei Amasaki ‟LOVE TRAIN 2522”(2018-2019)
 Hi Score Girl Dojo(ハイスコアガール道場, Hi Score Girl Dōjō)(2018 - 2020)
 Kengo Kawanishi, Kōhei Amasaki “Tenkaippin”(河西健吾 天﨑滉平 天河一品, Kawanishi Kengo Amasaki Kōhei Tenkaippin)(2019-))
 Isekai Cheat Radio(異世界チート放送局, Isekai Cheat Hōsōkyoku)(2019)
 Ensemble stars!! Radio Square!! of “ALKALOID” & “Crazy:B” (あんさんぶるスターズ!!『ALKALOID』&『Crazy:B』のラジオスクエア！！, Ensemble stars!! “ALKALOID”& “Crazy:B” no Radio Square)(2019-)

Awards and nominations

References

External links
Official talent profile 

Living people
Japanese male voice actors
Male voice actors from Osaka
1990 births
Japanese male video game actors
Seiyu Award winners
21st-century Japanese male actors
I'm Enterprise voice actors